Waitea is a genus of fungi in the family Corticiaceae. Basidiocarps (fruit bodies) are corticioid, thin, effused, and web-like, but species are more frequently encountered in their similar but sterile anamorphic states. Several species are plant pathogens, causing commercially significant damage to cereal crops and amenity turf grass.

References

External links

Corticiales
Agaricomycetes genera